The concert saloon was an American adaptation of the English music hall, and a precursor of variety and vaudeville theater. As in the music hall, alcohol was served. The entertainment at the saloon was to hold the imbiber's attention so they would imbibe more.

Further reading 
Zellers, Parker R. (Dec., 1968). "The Cradle of Variety: The Concert Saloon".
Educational Theatre Journal, Vol. 20, No. 4, 578-585

References 

Vaudeville theaters
American culture
Comedy
Entertainment in the United States
Theatrical genres